John Duport (died 1617) was an English scholar and translator.

Dr John Duport was born in Shepshed in Leicestershire. He was educated at Jesus College, Cambridge, where he became a Fellow in 1574. In 1583 he became rector of Fulham, and in 1585 precentor of St Paul's Cathedral. In 1590 he was appointed Master of Jesus College.
He served as Director of the "Second Cambridge Company" charged by James I of England with translating parts the Apocrypha for the King James Version of the Bible. In 1609 he added the prebendary of Ely to his income.

Duport married Rachel Cox, daughter of Richard Cox, Bishop of Ely. Their son, James Duport, a child when John Duport died, also became a scholar, and Master of Magdalene College.

References

Year of birth missing
16th-century births
1617 deaths
Translators of the King James Version
17th-century English translators
Fellows of Jesus College, Cambridge
Masters of Jesus College, Cambridge
People from Shepshed
16th-century English Anglican priests
17th-century English Anglican priests
Vice-Chancellors of the University of Cambridge